Occidozyga vittata is a species of frog in the family Dicroglossidae.
It is endemic to southern and central Vietnam, where it was recorded in Đà Lạt, Lâm Đồng Province and Thừa Thiên-Huế Province.

References

Occidozyga
Endemic fauna of Vietnam
Amphibians of Vietnam
Amphibians described in 1942
Taxonomy articles created by Polbot